Whip It or Whippit may refer to:

 "Whip It" (Devo song), a song by American new wave band Devo
 "Whip It" (Nicki Minaj song), a song by hip hop artist Nicki Minaj
 "Whip It!" (song), a song by LunchMoney Lewis featuring Chloe Angelides
 Whip It (film), a 2009 film
 Whippits, whipped-cream chargers used as a source of recreational nitrous oxide
 Whippit, a recurring location in the Carry On series of films
 Whippit, a sawed-off shotgun created by bank robber Clyde Barrow

See also 
 Whippet (disambiguation)